The Historical Atlas of China is an 8-volume work published in Beijing between 1982 and 1988, edited by Tan Qixiang. It contains 304 maps and 70,000 placenames in total.
The Concise Historical Atlas of China was published in 1991.

Contents 

The atlas consists of 8 volumes:
 Archaeological findings, Xia, Shang dynasties and Zhou dynasty (Western Zhou, Spring and Autumn period and Warring States period)
 Qin dynasty, Western and Eastern Han dynasties
 Three Kingdoms and Western Jin dynasty
 Eastern Jin dynasty, Sixteen Kingdoms and Southern and Northern Dynasties
 Sui dynasty, Tang dynasty and Five Dynasties and Ten Kingdoms period
 Song dynasty, Liao dynasty and Jin Empire
 Yuan dynasty and Ming dynasty
 Qing dynasty
On each map, ancient places and water features are shown in black and blue respectively, superimposed on modern features, borders and claims, shown in brown.
All country-wide maps, from Paleolithic onward, include an inset showing the Nine-Dash Line in the South China Sea.
Placenames are given in simplified characters, though an edition of the atlas published in Hong Kong uses traditional characters.

Reception 
The Atlas is considered the most authoritative compendium of ancient place names and administrative boundaries, and a tremendous improvement on its predecessor, Yang Shoujing's Lidai yudi tu (Yangtu, "Yang's atlas", 1906–1911).
However, more controversial has been Tan's historical conception:

This vision has been criticized as anachronistically projecting 20th-century minority policy and border claims into the distant past, resulting in a distorted view of the history of peripheral areas, portraying their incorporation into China as an inevitable organic process, rather than the result of conquest.
Similarly, early states are often given overly precise and extensive outer borders, often based on contentious claims.
In his afterword to volume 8, written in 1987, Tan identified the Atlass indiscriminate inclusion of jimi and tusi areas within imperial territory as a flaw.

See also
General History of Chinese Administrative Divisions, a 13-volume series envisioned by Tan Qixiang and completed by his students

 References Works cited'

External links 
 Chinese Civilization in Time and Space: a project at Academia Sinica, Taiwan, based on a vectorization of Tan's atlas.

1980s books
China
Geographic history of China
History books about China